Jeonju Television or JTV is a regional television and radio broadcasting company based in Jeonju. The station is an affiliate of the SBS Network.

Stations

 Television
Channel - Ch. 33 (LCN 6-1)
Launched - September 27, 1997
Affiliated to - SBS
Call Sign - HLDQ-DTV
 FM radio (JTV Magic FM)
Frequency - FM 90.1 MHz
Launched - August 18, 2001
Affiliated to - SBS Power FM
Call Sign - HLDQ-FM

See also
SBS (Korea)

External links
 

Seoul Broadcasting System affiliates
Television channels and stations established in 1997
Mass media in Jeonju